Myczków  (Mychkiv) is a village in the administrative district of Gmina Solina, within Lesko County, Subcarpathian Voivodeship, in south-eastern Poland.

References

Villages in Lesko County